Formica manni is a species of ant in the family Formicidae.

References

Further reading

External links 
AntWeb.org website

manni
Articles created by Qbugbot
Insects described in 1913